Eito is a village in the northeastern part of the island of Santo Antão, Cape Verde, part of the municipality of Paul. It is situated 1 km southwest of Pombas, 2 km northeast of Figueiral and 15 km northeast of the island capital Porto Novo. Its population was 979 in 2010.

See also
List of villages and settlements in Cape Verde

References

Villages and settlements in Santo Antão, Cape Verde
Paul, Cape Verde